"Doowutchyalike" is a song performed by Digital Underground. The song was released independently by the group in 1989 and later included on their debut studio album Sex Packets. Produced and co-written by group leader Shock G, the song peaked at #19 on the Billboard rap chart in 1990.

Charts

References

1989 singles
Digital Underground songs
Song recordings produced by Shock G
Songs written by George Clinton (funk musician)
Songs written by Bootsy Collins
Songs written by Shock G
Songs written by Bernie Worrell
Tommy Boy Records singles
1989 songs